Frank Wörndl (born 28 June 1959) is a retired German Alpine skier. A four-time national slalom champion, Wörndl never won a World Cup race, and had mediocre results at the 1980 Olympics, finishing 10th in the slalom and 17th in the giant slalom. Yet he became one of the most successful German alpine skiers in history after winning the world slalom title in 1987 and an Olympic silver medal in 1988. He retired the same year and worked as a TV commentator for ZDF and Eurosport. In 2007 he opened a fitness studio in Sonthofen, and since 2011 he also performs as a singer.

References

1959 births
Living people
People from Sonthofen
Sportspeople from Swabia (Bavaria)
Alpine skiers at the 1980 Winter Olympics
Alpine skiers at the 1988 Winter Olympics
Olympic medalists in alpine skiing
Medalists at the 1988 Winter Olympics
Olympic alpine skiers of West Germany
Olympic silver medalists for West Germany
German male alpine skiers
20th-century German people